Andriy Oleksiyovych Lunin (born 11 February 1999) is a Ukrainian professional footballer who plays as a goalkeeper for La Liga club Real Madrid and the Ukraine national team.

Club career
Lunin is a product of FC Metalist Youth Sportive School (first trainer was Oleksandr Khrabrov) and FC Dnipro Youth Sportive School Systems (first trainer was Kostyantyn Pavlyuchenko).

Dnipro
From summer 2016, after graduation of the youth sportive school, he played in the FC Dnipro reserves. In the main-team squad, Lunin made his debut as a start-squad player at the age of 17, in the match against FC Karpaty Lviv on 16 October 2016 in the Ukrainian Premier League. He was Dnipro's first choice goalkeeper the rest of the season, playing in a total of 25 matches for the club, across the league and club competitions. However, at the end of the season, due to financial irregularities, Dnipro was relegated directly to the Ukrainian Second League (third level of football), and many players, Lunin included, were allowed to leave the club.

Zorya Luhansk
Lunin spent the 2017–18 season playing for FC Zorya Luhansk, where he once again quickly established himself as the first keeper. On 14 September 2017, Lunin made his European debut in a 0–2 Europa League group stage loss to Östersunds FK at Arena Lviv. He ended up playing in 36 matches across all competitions that season, including all six of Zorya's Europa League matches.

Real Madrid

On 19 June 2018, Real Madrid reached an agreement with Zorya Luhansk to sign Lunin in a reportedly €8.5 million plus 5 million add-ons deal. The deal concluded four days later, and he became the first Ukrainian to play for the club. On 27 August 2018, he was loaned to nearby fellow La Liga team CD Leganés, for the season. Halfway through the campaign, he stated that he was content with being second choice to Iván Cuéllar, and would complete his contract.

On 13 August 2019, he was loaned to Real Valladolid for the 2019–20 season. On 15 October 2019, Lunin was included in the 20 best under-21 players shortlist for the 2019 Golden Boy award.

On 15 January 2020, the loan with Real Valladolid was terminated. On the same day, Real Oviedo announced the loan of Lunin until 30 June 2020.

He made his first team debut for Real Madrid in a 1–2 extra time loss to Alcoyano in the 2020–21 Copa del Rey. With Madrid confirmed 2021–22 champions, Lunin made his league debut in the Madrid derby against Atlético Madrid on 8 May 2022, where Real lost 1–0. On 15 May 2022, he played against Cádiz, saving a penalty and allowing his team to draw 1–1 away from home.

On 5 October 2022, Lunin made his Champions League debut in a 2–1 win against Shakhtar Donetsk. On 16 October 2022, he became the first Ukrainian player to feature in El Clásico against Barcelona, with Real winning 3–1.

International career
Lunin made his Ukraine national team debut at the age of 19, on 23 March 2018, in a 1–1 friendly draw with Saudi Arabia.

In 2019, he backstopped Ukraine U20 team to their first ever FIFA U-20 World Cup victory. He played in six of his team's seven matches, having to miss the quarterfinal match against Colombia due to being called up to Ukraine's main squad for the UEFA Euro 2020 qualifying matches against Serbia and Luxembourg. After the 3–1 final match victory against South Korea, Lunin was awarded the Golden Glove as the best goalkeeper of the tournament.

Career statistics

Club

International

Honours
Real Madrid
La Liga: 2021–22
Supercopa de España: 2021–22
UEFA Champions League: 2021–22
UEFA Super Cup: 2022
FIFA Club World Cup: 2022

Ukraine U20
 FIFA U-20 World Cup: 2019

Individual
 Golden talent of Ukraine: 2017
 FIFA U-20 World Cup Golden Glove: 2019

References

External links

Profile at the Real Madrid CF website

1999 births
Living people
People from Krasnohrad
Sportspeople from Kharkiv Oblast
Ukrainian footballers
Association football goalkeepers
FC Dnipro players
FC Zorya Luhansk players
Real Madrid CF players
CD Leganés players
Real Valladolid players
Real Oviedo players
Ukrainian Premier League players
La Liga players
Segunda División players
UEFA Champions League winning players
Ukraine youth international footballers
Ukraine under-21 international footballers
Ukraine international footballers
Ukrainian expatriate footballers
Expatriate footballers in Spain
Ukrainian expatriate sportspeople in Spain